Brokęcino  is a village in the administrative district of Gmina Okonek, within Złotów County, Greater Poland Voivodeship, in west-central Poland. 

The village has a population of 220.

References

Villages in Złotów County